Half Brothers is a 2020 American comedy film directed by Luke Greenfield from a screenplay by Eduardo Cisneros and Jason Shuman. It stars Luis Gerardo Méndez, Connor Del Rio, José Zúñiga, Vincent Spano, Pia Watson and Juan Pablo Espinosa.

The film was released on December 4, 2020, by Focus Features.

Plot 
In 1994, Mexico, Young Renato Murguia's father Flavio has to immigrate to the US in search of economic opportunity. Although Flavio promises to return soon, he does not. Twenty-five years later, Renato is a successful executive of an aviation company in Mexico and is engaged to Pamela who already has a son Emilio.  Renato is contacted by a woman named Katherine, who says she is Flavio’s wife. She tells him that Flavio is very ill and wishes for Renato to see him in Chicago. Renato is still angry at his father for never returning all those years, but reluctantly ends up going to Chicago.

At a coffee shop, a goofy man named Asher is trying to make a social media video and attempting to get a free coffee. When he doesn’t have money, he asks Renato to spot him. Renato refuses, and when Asher presses him, Renato steps up to order his coffee and pay for all the doughnuts on the counter, asking for them to all be discarded because Asher wanted them.

Renato meets Flavio at the hospital for the first time in decades. Asher enters the room and as it turns out, he is Flavio's son too. Flavio reveals to the two men that they are brothers. Both of them are displeased but Flavio asks them to do one last favor for him, to look for Eloise, after delivering an envelope to a man named Evaristo.

Flavio dies the next day. Renato attends the funeral. Asher tries to convince him to fulfill their father’s dying wish, but Renato still doesn’t want to. He leaves the funeral but eventually relents and turns around to tell Asher to pick him up the next day from his hotel so they can head out.

On the road, Renato falls asleep and wakes up at a goat farm, finding Asher running toward the car with a small goat as three men with rifles chase Asher. The guys make it out of there, but Renato yells at Asher for stopping just for a goat farm. To make matters worse, they are even further away from Evaristo. After the detour, they make it to an old factory where Flavio worked with Katherine, and Renato is stunned to see that they specialized in remote controlled airplanes. They meet a man who tells them to find Evaristo at a bar.

The guys go to the bar and meet Evaristo, who provides them with a key. He tells Renato about how Flavio did everything he could to make enough money and return home. He worked in the factory until he came up with the idea to make the toy planes, which revitalized the company with help from Katherine. They had a good professional relationship that turned into a one-night stand. Flavio felt guilty for betraying his wife, so he left to try and make his way back home once he had enough money. Evaristo then gives Renato a box with another envelope that says Mr. B. Before they can learn anything else, Asher forces them to run again when he picks a fight with guys he made a bad pool bet with.

The two stop at a motel where they try to solve the next clue in Flavio’s envelope. They figure out to go to a pawn shop in Oklahoma City. The next day, they reach the shop and meet Mr. B, the owner who presents them with Flavio’s wedding ring. Mr. B explains that when Renato was getting ready to return home, he was mugged in a bathroom by two men who saw him take out his money on the bus. Beaten and bloodied, he went to the shop and tried to pawn something off, and Mr. B said he would take the ring. Although Flavio didn’t want to give it up, Mr. B offered to buy the ring and keep it there until he had the money to buy it back. After this, he attempted to cross the border but was arrested and thrown in jail. He got sick afterward, and the guards dumped him on the side of the road to die. Before telling anything else, Mr. B gives them an envelope for Eloise. Renato is now fed up and just wants to go home. He grabs his bag and heads to an airport, leaving Asher behind.

When Renato gets to the airport, he discovers he doesn’t have his passport on him. With no other options, he calls Asher to apologize and ask for help. Their final destination is a church. While they have dinner, Asher reveals he threw away Renato’s passport to stop him from leaving so they can complete their dad’s request. Renato flips out and locks Asher in the bathroom so that he can steal the car and get away. However, he becomes remorseful midway through and tries to turn around. Unfortunately, he is stopped and arrested by a border patrol officer. Renato is thrown into detention with other undocumented immigrants until he is bailed out the next morning. He briefly stops to look sadly at the other people in there.

Renato reunites with Asher in a diner and finds him with a black eye. He tells Renato that the cabin belonged to some rednecks they previously encountered at a gas station that mocked Asher for having the goat, which they also stole and are planning to eat. Renato and Asher return to the cabin and fill the place with gas to knock out the rednecks and save the goat.

Renato decides to go to the church. They meet a nun who takes them to a cabinet that requires a code. Renato looks at the envelope with Eloise written on it and then turns it upside down to reveal the numbers code. They open it to find a DVD from Flavio explaining himself to his sons. After being left out by the prison guards, he set out to return home but felt remorseful for leaving Katherine without explanation. When he found her again, she had already given birth to Asher. Not wanting to leave another son behind, he called his wife to let her and Renato know that he wasn’t going to come home, and that was when Renato stopped caring for him. Flavio goes further and explains that although he did love Asher, he tried to recapture too much of Renato in him and distanced himself when he saw that Asher was totally different. He explains that he loved both of them and hopes that they can not only forgive him but grow as brothers. Both men are moved to tears.

The nun then shows the guys that Eloise really is an actual plane built by Flavio to pass down to his sons. Now having a way of getting home, mere hours before the wedding, Renato gets ready to part ways with Asher and the goat. However, he changes his mind and invites them both to the wedding. They fly away together and return to Mexico.

Renato and Pamela get married and Renato starts to make a bond with Emilio by having him fly a toy plane, which crashes into a nearby house, causing everyone to flee.

Cast 
 Luis Gerardo Méndez as Renato 
 Connor Del Rio as Asher
 José Zúñiga as Evaristo
 Vincent Spano as Mr. B
 Pia Watson as Pamela
 Juan Pablo Espinosa as Flavio
 Jwaundace Candece as Doris

Production
In May 2019, it was announced Luis Gerardo Méndez had joined the cast of the film, with Luke Greenfield directing from a screenplay by Eduardo Cisneros and Jason Shuman with Focus Features producing and distributing. In June 2019, Connor Del Rio joined the cast of the film. In August 2019, Pia Watson,  Juan Pablo Espinosa and Vincent Spano joined the cast of the film.

Principal photography began in New Mexico in July 2019, and lasted 31 days.

Reception

Box office 
The film grossed $720,000 from 1,369 theaters in its opening weekend, finishing second at the box office. It remained in second in its sophomore weekend, falling 30% to $490,000. On its third weekend it earned $200,000 more.

Critical response 
On review aggregator website Rotten Tomatoes, the film holds an approval rating of 36% and an average rating of 5.2/10, based on 45 reviews. The site's critics consensus reads: "Half road trip comedy, half family drama, Half Brothers adds up to a less-than-halfway-entertaining look at immigration through the experiences of two siblings." According to Metacritic, which sampled seven critics and calculated a weighted average score of 30 out of 100, the film received "generally unfavorable reviews". Audiences polled by CinemaScore gave the film an average grade of "B" on an A+ to F scale, while PostTrak reported 77% of audience members gave the film a positive score, with 47% saying they would definitely recommend it.

See also
Rain Man

References

External links
 
 

2020 films
2020 comedy films
American comedy films
Films shot in New Mexico
Films directed by Luke Greenfield
Films with screenplays by Ali LeRoi
2020s English-language films
2020s American films